Samo Udrih (born August 2, 1979) is a Slovenian former professional basketball player and basketball coach.

Professional career
Udrih played with the Dallas Mavericks NBA Summer League team in 2005. In November 2010, he signed with Panellinios of the Greek League. On December 16, 2014, he signed with Italian team Givova Scafati. On February 1, 2015, he parted ways with Givova Scafati. On February 24, 2015, he signed with Inter Bratislava of the Slovak Extraliga.

National team career
As a member of the senior men's Slovenian national basketball team, Udrih competed at the EuroBasket 2009, EuroBasket 2011 and at the 2010 FIBA World Championship.

Personal
His father Silvo played for Zlatorog Laško, and his brother Beno Udrih, is a former professional basketball player who spent most of his career in the NBA.

References

External links

Eurobasket.com Profile
Euroleague.net Profile
2010 FIBA World Championship Profile
Spanish League Profile 
Adriatic League Profile
Kosarka.hr Profile

1979 births
Living people
ABA League players
Aix Maurienne Savoie Basket players
CB Estudiantes players
CB Girona players
CB Granada players
CB Valladolid players
Greek Basket League players
Guards (basketball)
Hapoel Tel Aviv B.C. players
KD Slovan players
KK Cibona players
KK Olimpija players
KK Zlatorog Laško players
Liga ACB players
Panellinios B.C. players
Scafati Basket players
Shooting guards
Slovenian expatriate basketball people in Croatia
Slovenian expatriate basketball people in France
Slovenian expatriate basketball people in Greece
Slovenian expatriate basketball people in Italy
Slovenian expatriate basketball people in Spain
Slovenian men's basketball players
Small forwards
Sportspeople from Celje
2010 FIBA World Championship players